Byng High School is a public secondary school in Byng, Oklahoma, United States. It serves grades 10-12 for the Byng Public Schools.

Academics
This school offers a two-year Chickasaw language course.

References

External links

Byng Public Schools

Public high schools in Oklahoma
Education in Pontotoc County, Oklahoma
Buildings and structures in Pontotoc County, Oklahoma
Educational institutions in the United States with year of establishment missing